John Jones (1800-1876) and Doria Deighton-Jones (1824-1908) were husband-and-wife landowners and developers in 19th- and early 20th-century Los Angeles, California. John Jones was president of the Los Angeles Common Council, the governing body of that city, in 1870–1871.

Personal

John Jones, a Jew, was born in Warsaw, Poland in 1800 and emigrated to Britain. After being transported to Australia following a criminal trial in 1836, he came to the United States and settled in Los Angeles. He was married in 1858 to Doria Deighton, born in Perth, Scotland,  on  June 6, 1824; the marriage occurred three years after Doria came to Los Angeles from San Francisco. "Some historians posit that Mrs. Jones converted to Judaism prior to her marriage to Jones." Others maintain that she never ever converted. In Los Angeles the couple lived in a "large adobe home" adjoining the present site of Olvera Street in the Los Angeles Plaza Historic District. They had three children, including son Mark Gordon and daughters Constance (Simpson) and Caroline A. (Mrs. James B. Lankershim).

John Jones died in 1877. Doria Deighton-Jones died on 24 March 1908 at the age of 84, in her home at 955 South Hill Street. At the time of her death, "She is said to have been the oldest 'white woman' resident of the city."

Business
John Jones was a wholesale grocer, and by 1853 the first wholesale liquor dealer in Los Angeles, with their business located the Arcadia Block at the corner of Main and Commercial Streets. By 1866 he had sold it to Harris Newmark, who had premises next to his.

Doria Deighton-Jones became a property developer after her husband's death. She was known as the "owner of a vast estate in and around Los Angeles" valued at a million dollars, at the time of her death in 1908.

Public service

John Jones was elected as the city's 1st Ward representative on the Los Angeles Common Council, for a one-year term ending December 11, 1871. Fellow Common Council members chose him as the first Jewish president of the city's governing body, during his term.

Doria Deighton-Jones was an organizer of the Ladies' Hebrew Benevolent Society of Los Angeles in 1870, the city's first philanthropic organization, and served as its treasurer.

Buildings legacy

Olvera Street
Doria Deighton-Jones built the Simpson-Jones Building in 1894 at the #1 Olvera Street site of the family's 1840s adobe house on the Plaza, which had been torn down in 1886 when Bath Street was widened to make an extension of Main Street.   It was constructed to house William Gregory Engines, also known as Moline Engines.  Later tenants were the Diamond Shirt Company and the Soochow Restaurant. To its north is the Machine Shop building, built in 1886 on the site of the adobe's stables. After Olvera Street became a Mexican Alta California era-themed shopping area in 1930, the shop's main entryway was switched from the Main to the Olvera facade, and is the present day entrance of El Luz del Día restaurant. Its facade was remodeled in 1960 to resemble a mid-19th century Mexican bank. The name honors the Jones' daughter, Constance Jones Simpson. She inherited the property in 1908.

Alvarado Terrace
In 1902 Doria Jones subdivided her property in the Alvarado Terrace neighborhood of the Pico-Union district in Central Los Angeles. The lots were sold for only $10 each, but required the buyers to build houses that cost at least $4,000. It was publicized as "The only exclusive Residential Tract in the city. . . No flats, cottages or stores." It is the present day Alvarado Terrace Historic District, on the National Register of Historic Places.

Doria Apartments
Around 1905 the Doria Apartments building was built by Doria Jones at 1600-1604 West Pico Boulevard. It was designed in the Mission Revival style by Gotfred Hanson. It is a registered Los Angeles Historic-Cultural Monument.

References

Access to the Los Angeles Times links may require the use of a LAPL library card.

Married couples
American people of Polish-Jewish descent
American real estate businesspeople
Businesspeople from Los Angeles
Land owners from California
1800 births
1876 deaths
1824 births
1908 deaths
Jews and Judaism in Los Angeles
Los Angeles Common Council (1850–1889) members
19th-century American politicians
Polish emigrants to the United States
Scottish emigrants to the United States
19th-century American businesspeople